The 2015 Eastleigh Borough Council election took place on 7 May 2015 to elect 14, approximately one third of the members of Eastleigh Borough Council in England as one of the English local elections coinciding with the 2015 General Election. The local authority holds its elections in three years out of four ('by thirds').

Results
Liberal Democrats maintained their majority group, slightly reduced by two councillors to hold 38 of the 44 councillors across its 14 wards.  The gains were of two seats to Conservatives and no other seats changed hands.

Ward by ward
            						
			 			
            			 			
			 			
            						
			 			
            						
			 			
            	

Sarah Bain later left the Liberal Democrats to sit as an independent councillor in August 2017.

References

2015 English local elections
May 2015 events in the United Kingdom
2015
2010s in Hampshire